Sir Samuel Ferguson (10 March 1810 – 9 August 1886) was an Irish poet, barrister, antiquarian, artist and public servant. He was an acclaimed 19th-century Irish poet, and his interest in Irish mythology and early Irish history can be seen as a forerunner of William Butler Yeats and the other poets of the Irish Literary Revival.

Early life

Ferguson was born in Belfast, Ireland the third son of John Ferguson and Agnes Knox. His father was a spendthrift and his mother was a conversationalist and lover of literature, who read out the works of Shakespeare, Walter Scott, Keats, Shelley and other English-language authors to her six children.

Ferguson lived at a number of addresses, including Glenwhirry, where he later said he acquired a love of nature that inspired his works. He studied at the Belfast Academy and the Belfast Academical Institution. Later, he moved to Dublin, for law education at Trinity College, obtaining his BA in 1826 and his MA in 1832.

His father had exhausted the family property and Ferguson was forced to support himself through his student years. He turned to writing and was a regular contributor to Blackwood's Magazine by the age of 22. He was called to the bar in 1838, but continued to write and publish, both in Blackwood's and in the newly established Dublin University Magazine.

Later life

Ferguson settled in Dublin, where he practiced law. In 1846, he toured European museums, libraries and archaeological sites with strong connections to Irish scholarship.

He married Mary Guinness (1823–1905) in 1848, a great-great-niece of Arthur Guinness, and the eldest daughter of Robert Rundell Guinness who founded the Guinness Mahon bank. At that time he was defending the Young Irelander poet Richard Dalton Williams. He retired from the bar in 1867 when he was appointed First Deputy Keeper of Public Records of Ireland.

As well as his poetry, Ferguson contributed a number of articles on topics of Irish interest to antiquarian journals. In 1863, he traveled in Brittany, Ireland, Wales, England and Scotland to study megaliths and other archaeological sites. These studies were important to his major antiquarian work, Ogham Inscriptions in Ireland, Wales, and Scotland, which was edited after his death by his widow and published in 1887.

His collected poems, Lays of the Western Gael was published in 1865, resulting in the award of a degree LL.D. honoris causa from Trinity. He wrote many of his poems with both Irish and English translations. He received a knighthood in 1878.

Ferguson's major work, the long poem Congal was published in 1872 and a third volume, Poems in 1880. In 1882, he was elected president of the Royal Irish Academy, an organisation dedicated to the advancement of science, literature and antiquarian studies. His house in North Great George's Street, Dublin, was open to everyone interested in art, literature or music.

Ferguson gave the Rhind Lectures in 1884, on 'Ogham inscriptions in Ireland and Scotland'.

He died in Howth, just outside Dublin city, and was buried in Donegore near Templepatrick, County Antrim.

Works

References

Biography

External links
 

1810 births
1886 deaths
Irish poets
Irish folklorists
19th-century Irish people
People educated at the Belfast Royal Academy
Irish archivists
Irish Presbyterians
British antiquarians
Irish antiquarians
Writers from Belfast
Ulster Scots people
Lawyers from Dublin (city)
19th-century poets
Presidents of the Royal Irish Academy